Germain Francelin Tiko Messina (born 29 April 1990) is a Cameroonian professional footballer who plays as a midfielder for Régional 1 club Mâcon.

Personal life 
Messina's daughter Serenna was born 25 August 2017 in Mâcon.

References

External links

1990 births
Living people
Footballers from Yaoundé
Cameroonian footballers
Association football midfielders
Segunda División B players
Tercera División players
First Professional Football League (Bulgaria) players
Football League (Greece) players
Division d'Honneur players
Régional 1 players
Rot-Weiss Essen players
MSV Duisburg players
RCD Espanyol B footballers
SD Compostela footballers
Pontevedra CF footballers
FC Etar 1924 Veliko Tarnovo players
Apollon Pontou FC players
CF Gavà players
UF Mâconnais players
Cameroonian expatriate footballers
Expatriate footballers in Germany
Expatriate footballers in Spain
Expatriate footballers in Bulgaria
Expatriate footballers in Greece
Expatriate footballers in France
Cameroonian expatriate sportspeople in Germany
Cameroonian expatriate sportspeople in Spain
Cameroonian expatriate sportspeople in Bulgaria
Cameroonian expatriate sportspeople in Greece
Cameroonian expatriate sportspeople in France